Gladys Adda (1921 - 1995) was a Tunisian communist and activist for independence and women's rights.

Life
Adda was born in Gabès on 2 June 1921 into a Jewish family. Unusually she was educated first with girls and then coeducationally. Despite attending primary school classes with a mix of Muslim, Jewish, and European girls, all of her teachers were French or European; the experience of undisguised racism from European teachers awakened Adda's awareness of European colonialism. Her Jewish community suffered some racism from antisemitic fascists, but the community was protected by the Muslim majority. Aged fifteen she was married to a man seven years her senior and she remained married to him for seven years until she divorced him. At the time Tunisia was part of the French Empire except during the Second World War when it was occupied by Nazi Germany. Adda engaged in political activism by covertly distributing anti-Nazi and anti-colonial leaflets against the German occupying forces in Vichy Tunisia.

In 1944 she met and married her second husband, Georges Adda, and they had twins. Their son Serge Adda became a successful French businessperson. The same year she, Neila Haddad and Gilda khiari were co-founders of the Union of the Women of Tunisia (UFT). This was an organisation associated with the local communist party and it was led by Nabiha Ben Miled who was a Muslim. She became involved with organising free clinics for women and alternative schooling for children and adults. At the time access to education at colonial schools was being denied as a result of the demands for Tunisian independence. The Addas were seen as a risk and Georges was imprisoned in the 1950s.

She and the UFT were involved in petitioning the French authorities on behalf of condemned Tunisian prisoners. Tunisia achieved independence in 1956 and unlike many she and her husband decided to stay in Tunisia, She and the UFT did not disband and they extended their support to activists in Algeria who were still trying to achieve independence from France. Adda and her friend, became involved in the early distribution of Tunisian newspapers and as a result she gave lectures in Tunis.

Her widower Georges died in 2009.

References

1921 births
1995 deaths
Anti-fascism in the Arab world
Jewish anti-fascists
Jewish resistance members during the Holocaust
Jewish socialists
People from Gabès
Tunisian activists
Tunisian communists
Tunisian feminists
Tunisian human rights activists
Tunisian Jews
Tunisian women activists
Mizrahi feminists
Tunisian socialist feminists
20th-century Tunisian women
Female anti-fascists